Bankend is a village in South Lanarkshire, Scotland. It is located near the villages of Braehead, Coalburn and Cumberhead.

History
Sometime after the opening of Coalburn railway station in 1891, Bankend railway station opened. It was the terminus of the Coalburn Branch, and closed in July 1926. There was also a Bankend Tramway around the same time. As a result of opencast coal mining, the mining village of Bankend was obliterated.

See also
List of places in South Lanarkshire

References

Villages in South Lanarkshire